The 1997 Canadian Grand Prix was a Formula One motor race held at Circuit Gilles Villeneuve on 15 June 1997. The race was stopped early on lap 54 after a big crash involving Olivier Panis, who broke his legs and would be unable to start the next seven Grands Prix. Michael Schumacher won ahead of Jean Alesi in the Benetton and Giancarlo Fisichella in the Jordan. David Coulthard had been leading, but was delayed for over a lap by a clutch problem during his second pit stop, shortly before Panis's crash. On lap 2, local driver Jacques Villeneuve crashed into the wall on the exit of the final corner. This wall  would later be known as the 'Wall of Champions', after three former World Champions, including Villeneuve, crashed into it separately in the 1999 race.

It also marked the debut of Alexander Wurz, driving for Benetton in place of his compatriot Gerhard Berger. Berger had been suffering from a sinus illness for some time and during his time off his father was killed in a light aircraft accident.

Classification

Qualifying

Race

Championship standings after the race

Drivers'   Championship standings

Constructors'   Championship standings

 Note:   Only the top five positions are included for both sets of standings.

References

Canadian Grand Prix
Canadian Grand Prix
Grand Prix
1990s in Montreal
1997 in Quebec
Grand Prix